

se

sea-sef
Sea-Mist
Seasonale 
Seba-Gel
Sebcur
Sebizon
sebriplatin (INN)
secalciferol (INN)
secbutabarbital (INN)
seclazone (INN)
secnidazole (INN)
secobarbital (INN)
Seconal 
secoverine (INN)
Secran
Secreflo 
secretin (INN)
Sectral 
secukinumab (INN)
securinine (INN)
Sedapap 
sedecamycin (INN)
Seffin

seg-seo
seganserin (INN)
seglitide (INN)
Selax
Seldane
Selecor
Select 1/35
Selectol
selegiline (INN)
selenomethionine (75 Se) (INN)
Selepen
selepressin (INN)
Selestoject
seletracetam (USAN, (INN))
selexipag (INN)
selfotel (INN)
seliciclib (INN)
selodenoson (USAN)
Selpak
selprazine (INN)
Selsun 
seltraposin (INN)
selumetinib (USAN)
selurampanel (INN)
semagacestat (USAN, INN)
semaglutide (INN)
sematilide (INN)
semduramicin (INN)
Semicid
Semilente 
semorphone (INN)
semotiadil (INN)
semparatide (INN)
Semprex-D 
semuloparin (USAN, INN)
semustine (INN)
Senexon
senicapoc (USAN)
Sennatural
senofilcon A (USAN)
Senokot
Senolax
Sensipar 
Sensorcaine 
seocalcitol (INN)

sep-seq
sepantronium bromide (INN, USAN)
sepazonium chloride (INN)
sepimostat (INN)
seprilose (INN)
seproxetine (INN)
Septi-Soft 
Septisol 
Septocaine 
Septra 
sequifenadine (INN)

ser
Ser-A-Gen 
Ser-Ap-Es

sera-serp
seractide (INN)
seratrodast (INN)
Serax 
serazapine (INN)
Serc 
Serdaxin (Rexahn Pharmaceuticals)
serdemetan (INN)
serelaxin (INN)
Serentil 
Serevent 
serfibrate (INN)
sergliflozin (USAN)
sergolexole (INN)
seridopidine (INN)
serine (INN)
serlopitant (USAN)
sermetacin (INN)
sermorelin (INN)
Seromycin 
Serophene 
Seroquel (AstraZeneca)
Serostim 
Serpalan 
Serpanray 
Serpasil 
Serpatabs
Serpate 
Serpivite

serr-serz
serrapeptase (INN)
sertaconazole (INN)
sertindole (INN)
sertraline (INN)
serum gonadotrophin (INN)
Serutan
Servisone 
Serzone

set-sez
setastine (INN)
setazindol (INN)
Sethotope 
setileuton (USAN, INN)
setipafant (INN)
setipiprant (INN)
setiptiline (INN)
setoperone (INN)
setrobuvir (USAN)
sevelamer (INN)
sevirumab (INN)
sevitropium mesilate (INN)
sevoflurane (INN)
sevopramide (INN)
Sevorane AF
sezolamide (INN)

sf-sh
sfericase (INN)
Shade Uvaguard 
Shur-Seal